The 2015–2016 season was Sarajevo's 67th season in existence, and their 22nd consecutive season in the top flight of Bosnian football, the Premier League of BiH. Besides competing in the Premier League, the team competed in the National Cup and the qualifications for UEFA Champions League.

Players

Squad

(Captain)

 (C)

(Captain)

(C)

(C)

(C)

(C)

Statistics

Kit

Friendlies

Competitions

Premier League

League table

Matches

Cup of Bosnia and Herzegovina

Round of 32

Round of 16

Quarter-finals

UEFA Champions League

Second qualifying round

References

External links

FK Sarajevo seasons
Sarajevo